Kolagatla Veerabhadra Swamy is an Indian politician from the YSR Congress Party. He is a current Deputy Speaker of the Andhra Pradesh Legislative Assembly & member of the Andhra Pradesh Legislative Assembly from Vizianagaram Assembly constituency 2019 and also served from 2004 to 2009. He was elected as Deputy Speaker in the Assembly on 19 September 2022.

References 

Living people
YSR Congress Party politicians
Year of birth missing (living people)
Andhra Pradesh MLAs 2019–2024